Glyphostomoides is a genus of sea snails, marine gastropod mollusks in the family Raphitomidae.

Species
 Glyphostomoides queenslandica (Shuto, 1983)

References

 Shuto, T. 1983. New turrid taxa from the Australian waters. Memoirs of the Faculty of Sciences of Kyushu University, Series D, Geology 25: 1-26

External links
 Worldwide Mollusc Species Data Base: Raphitomidae
  Bouchet, P.; Kantor, Y. I.; Sysoev, A.; Puillandre, N. (2011). A new operational classification of the Conoidea (Gastropoda). Journal of Molluscan Studies. 77(3): 273-308

 
Raphitomidae
Gastropod genera